Christopher Steven Mihm (born July 16, 1979) is an American former professional basketball center who played nine seasons in the National Basketball Association (NBA). After playing college basketball at Texas, he was drafted with the seventh overall pick in the 2000 NBA draft by the Chicago Bulls.

Early life
Mihm was born in Milwaukee, Wisconsin, to Gary and Nina Mihm and later moved to Texas. At the age of 14, he was ranked among Texas' top tennis players in his age group. His opponents included future US Open champion Andy Roddick and NFL quarterback Drew Brees, both of whom resided in the area.

College career
Mihm played his college basketball at the University of Texas at Austin, where he was one of the top players in school history. In 2021, he ranked first on UT's all-time blocks list (264), second in double-doubles (47), and fourth in rebounds (945).

Freshman season
In the summer before his freshman year, Mihm spent time working out with San Antonio Spurs center David Robinson.

NBA career

Cleveland Cavaliers (2000–2003)
Mihm was picked seventh overall by the Chicago Bulls but was then traded to the Cleveland Cavaliers for Jamal Crawford. During his rookie season, he started 43 of 59 games for the Cavs, but injuries caused him to miss the other 23. In his 28th game (February 19, 2001, versus the same Bulls team that had drafted him), Mihm recorded the first assist of his career.

Memphis Grizzlies (2009)
Mihm was traded to the Grizzlies for a failed conditional 2013 second-round pick on February 18, 2009.

NBA career statistics

Regular season

|-
| style="text-align:left;"| 
| style="text-align:left;"| Cleveland
| 59 || 43 || 19.8 || .442 || .000 || .794 || 4.7 || .3 || .3 || .9 || 7.6
|-
| style="text-align:left;"| 
| style="text-align:left;"| Cleveland
| 74 || 60 || 22.4 || .420 || .429 || .693 || 5.3 || .3 || .2 || 1.2 || 7.7
|-
| style="text-align:left;"| 
| style="text-align:left;"| Cleveland
| 52 || 0 || 15.6 || .404 || .000 || .724 || 4.4 || .5 || .3 || .7 || 5.9
|-
| style="text-align:left;"| 
| style="text-align:left;"| Cleveland
| 22 || 1 || 17.8 || .465 || .000 || .708 || 6.4 || .5 || .4 || 1.0 || 6.9
|-
| style="text-align:left;"| 
| style="text-align:left;"| Boston
| 54 || 16 || 17.4 || .500 || .000 || .644 || 5.1 || .2 || .5 || .8 || 6.1
|-
| style="text-align:left;"| 
| style="text-align:left;"| L.A. Lakers
| 75 || 75 || 24.9 || .507 || .000 || .678 || 6.7 || .7 || .2 || 1.4 || 9.8
|-
| style="text-align:left;"| 
| style="text-align:left;"| L.A. Lakers
| 59 || 56 || 26.1 || .501 || .000 || .716 || 6.3 || 1.0 || .3 || 1.2 || 10.2
|-
| style="text-align:left;"| 
| style="text-align:left;"| L.A. Lakers
| 23 || 5 || 12.1 || .337 || .000 || .667 || 3.3 || .6 || .2 || .6 || 3.6
|-
| style="text-align:left;"| 
| style="text-align:left;"| L.A. Lakers
| 18 || 0 || 5.8 || .375 || .000 || .857 || 1.9 || .6 || .1 || .3 || 2.0
|- class="sortbottom"
| style="text-align:center;" colspan="2"| Career
| 436 || 256 || 20.1 || .459 || .231 || .704 || 5.3 || .5 || .3 || 1.0 || 7.5

Playoffs

|-
| style="text-align:left;"| 2004
| style="text-align:left;"| Boston
| 4 || 0 || 16.3 || .318 || .000 || .600 || 4.5 || .0 || 1.0 || 1.0 || 5.0
|-
| style="text-align:left;"| 2008
| style="text-align:left;"| L.A. Lakers
| 1 || 0 || 3.0 || .000 || .000 || .000 || .0 || .0 || .0 || .0 || .0
|- class="sortbottom"
| style="text-align:center;" colspan="2"| Career
| 5 || 0 || 13.6 || .304 || .000 || .600 || 3.6 || .0 || .8 || .8 || 4.0

Notes

External links
Chris Mihm biography (2000-2007) by NBA

1979 births
Living people
All-American college men's basketball players
American men's basketball players
Basketball players from Milwaukee
Boston Celtics players
Centers (basketball)
Chicago Bulls draft picks
Cleveland Cavaliers players
Los Angeles Lakers players
Parade High School All-Americans (boys' basketball)
Texas Longhorns men's basketball players
Universiade gold medalists for the United States
Universiade medalists in basketball
Westlake High School (Texas) alumni
Medalists at the 1999 Summer Universiade